Holger Schüring (24 March 1938 – 5 September 2017), known professionally as Holger Czukay, was a German musician best known as a co-founder of the krautrock group Can. Described as "successfully bridg[ing] the gap between pop and the avant-garde", Czukay was also notable for having created early important examples of ambient music, for having explored "world music" well before the term was coined, and for having been a pioneer of sampling.

Biography
Czukay was born on 24 March 1938 in the Free City of Danzig (present-day Gdańsk, Poland), from which his family was expelled after World War II. Due to the turmoil of the war, Czukay's primary education was limited. One pivotal early experience, however, was working, when still a teenager, at a radio repair-shop, where he became fond of the aural qualities of radio broadcasts (anticipating his use of shortwave radio broadcasts as musical elements) and became familiar with the rudiments of electrical repair and engineering.

Czukay studied music under Karlheinz Stockhausen from 1963 to 1966 and then worked for a while as a music teacher. Initially Czukay had little interest in rock music, but this changed when a student played him the Beatles' 1967 song "I Am the Walrus", a psychedelic rock single with an unusual musical structure and blasts of AM radio noise. This opened his ears to music by rock experimentalists such as The Velvet Underground and Frank Zappa.

Czukay co-founded Can in 1968. He played bass guitar and undertook most of the recording and engineering for the group. Rosko Gee, former bassist of the British band Traffic, joined the band in 1977, with Czukay handling only tapes and sound effects on the album Saw Delight, his final LP with the group before departing for a solo career. Czukay had been sidelined due to creative disputes and his failure to progress as a bassist, admitting his shortcomings on the instrument which he had taken up "almost by default" in the early days of Can.
 
After his departure from Can, Czukay recorded several albums. One of his trademarks was the use of shortwave radio sounds and his early pioneering of sampling, in those days involving the painstaking cutting and splicing of magnetic tapes. He would tape-record various sounds and snippets from shortwave and incorporate them into his compositions. He also used shortwave as a live, interactive musical instrument (such as on 1991's Radio Wave Surfer), a method of composition he termed "radio painting". Czukay also stated "If you want to make something new, you shouldn't think too far beyond one certain idea".

Czukay collaborated with a considerable number of musicians, notably a series of albums with Jah Wobble and David Sylvian, two younger British musicians who shared his interest in blending pop music with experimental recording and sampling techniques. Other collaborators include U.N.K.L.E., Brian Eno, Eurythmics, and German Neue Deutsche Welle band Trio.

In 2009, after a problematic time with the record company that had been gradually re-releasing his albums on CD, Czukay began a new collaboration with the Claremont 56 record label, releasing vinyl-only remixes of tracks from earlier albums, as well as some new recordings. This approach changed Czukay's plans for his back catalogue, so that the original albums Der Osten ist Rot (1984), Rome Remains Rome (1987) and Moving Pictures (1993) are no longer being reissued (in the case of Moving Pictures, because the master tapes have degraded beyond repair). Instead, most of the tracks are being remade and newly organized as limited edition vinyl releases.

In 2018 it was announced that Czukay's work was collected a new retrospective box set, Cinema, which would include both classic and unreleased material from his solo career. The five-disc set, to be released in March, would  will also include many of his best-known collaborations, including those with Eno, Wobble, Sylvian and Stockhausen, as well as never-before-released material.

Personal life
Holger Czukay was married for over twenty years to the German painter and singer Ursula Kloss (known professionally as Ursa Major, and later, as U-She), with whom he collaborated on numerous multimedia pieces. Ursula Kloss-Schüring died on her 55th birthday (28 July 2017) after having been severely debilitated by illness for over a decade.

Death
Czukay's body was discovered inside his apartment on 5 September 2017. The New York Times reported that he had died on the same day, but the cause of his death was the subject of a police investigation. His death was eventually assumed to have been from natural causes.

Discography

Solo
 Canaxis 5 (1969, remastered and expanded 2006)
 Movies (1979, remastered and expanded 2007)
 On the Way to the Peak of Normal (1981)
 Der Osten ist Rot (1984)
 Rome Remains Rome (1987)
 Radio Wave Surfer (1991, remastered and expanded 2006) Live recordings made in 1984, 1986 & 1987
 Moving Pictures (1993)
 Good Morning Story (1999, remastered and expanded 2006)
 La Luna (2000, remastered and expanded 2007)
 Linear City (2001, remastered and remixed 2006)
 11 Years Innerspace (2015, 500 limited edition vinyl LP worldwide; also released on CD in Japan

Collaboration
 Biomutanten / Menetekel (as Les Vampyrettes with Conny Plank) (1981)
 Full Circle (1982) collaboration with Jah Wobble and Jaki Liebezeit (re-issue of a UK-only EP, expanded with two additional tracks)
 Snake Charmer (1983) EP, collaboration with Jah Wobble, The Edge, and Ben Mandelson
 Brilliant Trees (1984), with David Sylvian
 Plight & Premonition (1988, remastered 2018) collaboration with David Sylvian; remixed by Sylvian in 2002 and subsequently released in 2018 
 Flux + Mutability (1989, remastered 2018) collaboration with David Sylvian; reissued combined with Plight & Premonition in 2018
 Clash (1998, remastered and expanded 2007) collaboration with Dr. Walker
 The New Millennium (2003) with U-She
 Daemon In The Bar (2006) with Bob Humid
 Time and Tide (2001, remastered 2007) with U-She
 Freemix (2004)
 21st Century (2007) with Ursa Major - voice, Drew Kalapach - electronics
 Ode to Perfume / Fragrance (2009) 10 inch single, limited edition of 500
 Way to LA (2010) 10 inch single collaboration with Bison and Ursa Major
 Let's Get Hot / Let's Get Cool (2010) 12 inch single, limited edition of 500 red vinyl and 500 blue vinyl
 Persian Love (Remix) / My Persian Love (2010) 12 inch single,  gold vinyl, limited edition of 1001
 Dream Again (2010) 10 inch double EP of remixes from The East Is Red and Rome Remains Rome, clear vinyl, limited edition of 666
 Hit Hit Flop Flop (Remix) / Hey Baba Reebop (2011) 7 inch single, limited edition of 500

With Can

See also 
  (experimental film, 1987)
 List of ambient music artists

References

Further reading

External links
 
 Holger Czukay interview at bluefat.com (2004)
 Interview with Czukay at furious.com (1997)
 Dignose Records

1938 births
2017 deaths
Protopunk musicians
Ambient musicians
German rock bass guitarists
Male bass guitarists
Progressive rock bass guitarists
Can (band) members
Musicians from Gdańsk
Mute Records artists
People from the Free City of Danzig
Pupils of Karlheinz Stockhausen
Grönland Records artists
Virgin Records artists
German male guitarists
German anarchists